Mauritania competed at the 2020 Summer Olympics in Tokyo. Originally scheduled to take place from 24 July to 9 August 2020, the Games were postponed to 23 July to 8 August 2021, because of the COVID-19 pandemic. It was the nation's tenth appearance at the Summer Olympics.

Competitors
The following is the list of number of competitors in the Games.

Athletics

Mauritania received universality slots from the World Athletics to send two track and field athletes (one male and one female) to the Olympics.

Track & road events

References

Nations at the 2020 Summer Olympics
2020
2021 in Mauritanian sport